A Northern Soul is the second studio album by English alternative rock band The Verve. The album was released in the United Kingdom on 20 June 1995 on the Hut label and in the United States on 3 July 1995 on Vernon Yard Records. The title is a reference to Northern Soul, a popular soul movement in Britain during the 1970s.

A Northern Soul was a moderate success upon release, charting at number 13 in the UK, and has since received critical acclaim, as well as being ranked high in readers polls in popular music publications. This is the final album to feature the band's original line-up until 2008's Forth. In 2013, NME ranked it at number 390 in its list of the 500 Greatest Albums of All Time.

Background
Following their performance at Lollapalooza in 1994, The Verve returned to their Wigan-based practice room to begin writing and recording songs for their second studio album. Commenting on the effect that working in the "dark rehearsal room" had on the band's songwriting process, frontman Richard Ashcroft stated:

Initially, the band tried to record the LP inside the rehearsal room itself, so that "they could record as they had been rehearsing", but, when this approach proved to be impossible, they relocated the recording sessions to rural Wales with producer Owen Morris. Tom Hiney, writing for The Guardian in September 1997, claimed that the band's experience of recording during this period was "intense and morose, but it produced an album that will still be listened to in 30 years' time."

Recording
After encountering difficulties during the recording of their debut album, the band decided to take a more focused approach to the recording of A Northern Soul, with bassist Simon Jones stating, "I was like, 'I'm not going through that again. We are writing these songs before we even step through the doors.'" Guitarist Nick McCabe took a positive view of the early stages of the recording sessions for the album, stating: "when we went in we had no preconceived notion of what it was going to sound like. We just went in and played...and that's when you know you're playing really well, when you don't have to think about it. There were three weeks during the making of that record which I'd have to say were the best I've ever had in my life." However, the sessions soon became infamous for several incidents, with vocalist Richard Ashcroft describing the experience as "insane in ways that only good music, bad drugs and mixed emotions can make." These incidents varied in nature, from Ashcroft disappearing for days to producer Owen Morris smashing a window after the recording of "History". Morris later recalled: "They did my head in, completely and utterly. There you go. That's life. It's a fantastic album at the end of the day, but it's not a process that I'd ever want to go through again".

Music
A Northern Soul was a change in style for the band, moving from the psychedelic rock of their earlier work to alternative rock. Guitar Magazine writer Dan Eccleston claimed "the band retreated to their Wigan rehearsal room and plugged in, tuned up and flipped out into that parallel universe wherein the Verve song resides. And the result is A Northern Soul – a record whose deep, dark funky rock makes their actually rather lovely '93 debut A Storm in Heaven sound almost limp. The Verve essence remains – swirling guitar arpeggios, grand rock themes, sprawling structures – but it's warmer, denser and more powerful in every way."

The lyrics took on a more prominent and personal role, with Ashcroft explaining: "Each song is a northern soul going through different emotions. I hear this character all the way through the record; pretty pained, then elated, then arrogant. All facets of that personality are a northern soul. That's what I am." It has been claimed that many of the album's lyrics (particularly those of "History") were connected to Ashcroft's split with his girlfriend, with Ashcroft himself stating: "We were all working on the record and then I went off to London for about three months to sort some things out with my girlfriend at the time. Things didn't go so well, and I got really fucked up for about two of those months, both physically and mentally. When I got back, the strangest thing was that they were playing music that was precisely the way I was feeling and so the two just went together quite easily."

In a retrospective review of the album, Nick Southall of Stylus wrote: "The songs, such as they are, are long and have little structure, the production is murky and raw and harrowing, the tempo is unchanging to the point of testing endurance. There is no joy or even solace to be found in this record, only unforgiving turmoil. It is a traumatic realisation of the hopelessness of human existence, a document of fractured mentalities, the sound of four young men old before their time, scarred by life, already dead once and now desperately striving to be alive for just a moment before it all fades. Songs in the key of pain. Modern, urban, tortured psychedelic soul [...] A wall of noise, a sea of anguish, a masterpiece. On a hillside somewhere in the distance a man screams his desolation at the sky and curses his birth, overcome with fear that this emptiness may be all he can ever know. This record is his scream."

Critical reception

The album was a moderate success upon its release, reaching No. 13 on the UK album chart. However, in later years the album saw more acclaim, with readers of Q Magazine voting it the 53rd greatest album ever in 1998, and NME ranking it as the 28th best album of all time in 2003 and the 13th best British album in 2006. The album was also included in the book 1001 Albums You Must Hear Before You Die. In 2000 it was voted number 289 in Colin Larkin's All Time Top 1000 Albums. In 2013, NME ranked it at number 390 in its list of the 500 Greatest Albums of All Time.

Track listing

Richard Ashcroft dedicated track 5 to Oasis guitarist Noel Gallagher, who returned the honour by dedicating "Cast No Shadow" to "the genius of Richard Ashcroft" on (What's the Story) Morning Glory?.

Personnel
The Verve
 Richard Ashcroft – vocals; acoustic guitar on "On Your Own", "So It Goes", "History" and "Stormy Clouds"; percussion on "This Is Music", "So It Goes", "History" and "Life's an Ocean"; electric piano on "No Knock on My Door"
 Nick McCabe – electric guitar; piano on "On Your Own" and "Stormy Clouds"; 12-string guitar on "On Your Own"; acoustic guitar on "So It Goes" and "Stormy Clouds"; Hammond organ on "So It Goes"; Moog synthesizer on "Stormy Clouds"
 Simon Jones – bass; percussion on "A New Decade"; keyboards on "A Northern Soul"; 12-string acoustic guitar on "History"
 Peter Salisbury – drums; percussion on "A New Decade", "This Is Music", "So It Goes", "History" and "Life's an Ocean"
Additional personnel
 Liam Gallagher – handclaps on "History"
 Will Malone - string arrangement on "History"
 Gavin Wright & The Longdon Session Orchestra - strings on "History"
Technical personnel
 Owen Morris – producer; Hammond organ on "Brainstorm Interlude"; synthesised strings on "History", string arrangement on "History"
 Mark Lee – studio assistant
 Mastered by Jack Adams at The Townhouse
 Sleeve concept, design & art direction by Brian Cannon for microdot
 Photography by Michael Spencer Jones except: The Verve on the bus (Scarlet Page) and The Verve in the cafe (Mary Scanlon)

References

External links

A Northern Soul at YouTube (streamed copy where licensed)

The Verve albums
1995 albums
Hut Records albums
Virgin Records albums
Albums produced by Owen Morris